The 2019 DTM Misano round is a motor racing event for the Deutsche Tourenwagen Masters held between 8 and 9 June 2019. The event, part of the 33rd season of the DTM, was held at the Misano World Circuit Marco Simoncelli in Italy.

Background
Jamie Green was forced to sit out the event with appendicitis, and would be replaced with Audi Sport Team WRT driver Pietro Fittipaldi. Fittipaldi's seat was taken by 2017 and 2018 MotoGP runner-up Andrea Dovizioso, marking the Italian's debut in car racing.

Results

Race 1

Qualifying

Race

Race 2

Qualifying

Race

Championship standings

Drivers Championship

Teams Championship

Manufacturers Championship

 Note: Only the top five positions are included for three sets of standings.

See also
 2019 W Series Misano round

References

External links
Official website

|- style="text-align:center"
|width="35%"|Previous race:
|width="30%"|Deutsche Tourenwagen Masters2019 season
|width="40%"|Next race:

Misano DTM
DTM Misano